Lupachikha is a rural locality (a village) in Yavengskoye Rural Settlement, Vozhegodsky District, Vologda Oblast, Russia. The population was 2 as of 2002.

Geography 
Lupachikha is located 26 km northeast of Vozhega (the district's administrative centre) by road. Karpovskaya is the nearest rural locality.

References 

Rural localities in Vozhegodsky District